The characters of Oz, fictional characters on the television series about prison life, are a diverse mixture of inmates from various gangs and prison staff.

Main inmates

Key 

{| class="wikitable" style="width: 100%; margin-right: auto; background: #FFFFFF;"
|- style="color:white"
! style="background:#6699CC; width:20%;"| Character:
! style="background:#6699CC; width:25%;"| Portrayed by:
! style="background:#6699CC; width:10%;"| Appears in seasons:
|-
| colspan="5" bgcolor="#6699CC" |
|-
| Augustus Hill || Harold Perrineau || 1, 2, 3, 4, 5, 6
|-
| colspan="5" | The socially astute narrator of the show. Hill's narrations offer philosophical perspectives on given situations, frequently dealing with existential concepts and the nature of death. During his arrest for drug offenses, he killed a police officer. In retaliation, another officer threw him off a roof, leaving him paralyzed from the waist down. Due to his disability and distaste for heroin, he is not associated with the Homeboys until Redding, a surrogate father for Hill, arrives in Oz in season 4. He tries to remain neutral in most affairs and appears friendly with almost everyone: no inmate appears to wish him any particular harm aside from the Aryans' general dislike of non-white inmates and a brief period of exclusion from the Homeboys after he betrays them. He is often the moral compass of the show and shows great remorse for the deaths for which he is responsible. He is accidentally killed by Urbano while trying to protect Redding at the end of season 5. Despite this, he remains on the show throughout season 6 as a partial narrator alongside other dead characters.
|-
| colspan="5" bgcolor="#6699CC" |
|-
| Tobias Beecher || Lee Tergesen || 1, 2, 3, 4, 5, 6
|-
| colspan="5" | A former middle class lawyer in denial about his alcoholism, Beecher is convicted of driving whilst intoxicated and vehicular manslaughter after hitting a young girl. Thrown into the deep end in a super-max prison and forced to fend for himself, Beecher quickly learns he is out of his league. Not being street-savvy, Beecher is quickly taken advantage of by Aryan inmate Schillinger who dominates him, rapes him and sexually humiliates him during Season 1. Around this time, Beecher also becomes addicted to drugs to cope with the harsh reality of his surroundings, befriending Irish inmate Ryan O'Reilly. After reaching breaking point, Beecher attacks Schillinger and leaves his eye badly damaged. By the end of the first season, Beecher has become self-sufficient to a degree and is no longer a gullible pushover. His character undergoes the most drastic changes throughout the seasons, during which he becomes a drug addict and falls in love with Keller, a first for Beecher in encountering homosexuality. His relationship with Keller and blood feud with Schillinger is the series' dominant story arc, beginning in the first episode and being resolved during the series finale, when he accidentally kills Schillinger in an acted fight in a performance of Macbeth. By the end, Beecher is free of all his enemies, Keller having arranged for all remaining Aryans to be wiped out by a chemical release, which causes the entire prison to be evacuated.
|-
| colspan="5" bgcolor="#E3DAC9" |
|-
| Vernon Schillinger || J. K. Simmons || 1, 2, 3, 4, 5, 6
|-
| colspan="5" | The leader of the Aryan Brotherhood, Schillinger commits atrocities against other inmates because of race, sexual orientation, or overall weakness. He often takes pleasure by not just bullying and harassing, but also raping them and mostly being turned into his personal sex slaves, most notably former cellmate Beecher. Beecher soon became his main rival throughout the series, and sometimes granted help by Beecher's lover, Keller (who was also a long-time friend of Schillinger), to take him down. Schillinger remains a pivotal figure and antagonist, known for his brutality and pursuit of vengeance against his former cellmate, the central arc of the series. Their feud results in the deaths of both Schillinger's sons, the kidnap of Beecher's children and death of his son and the murder of Beecher's father, as well as the deaths of several other prisoners and even Officer Metzger. He undergoes a spiritual transformation in season 4 and he and Beecher try to forgive each other but this does not last. In the final season of the show, Schillinger is double-crossed by Keller during a production of the play Macbeth. With Schillinger playing Macbeth and Beecher playing Macduff, Keller switches the prop knife for a real one and he is fatally stabbed by Beecher. He dies, cursing Keller with his last breath when he realises his betrayal.
|-
| colspan="5" bgcolor="#228B22" |
|-
| Ryan O'Reily || Dean Winters || 1, 2, 3, 4, 5, 6
|-
| colspan="5" | Ryan O'Reily is an Irish-American inmate and one of the central characters in the show. O'Reily is characterised by his Machiavellianism, doing whatever it takes to survive through double-crossing, manipulation and betrayal. Despite his meek physical stature, O'Reily is a respected member within Emerald City for his lucrative drug connections and seemingly infinite resources and favours to call upon. Compared to ''Othellos Iago by show creator Fontana, O'Reily is responsible for almost every death in the first season. In the second and third seasons, Ryan's obsession with Dr. Nathan becomes destructive after she helps him through his battle with breast cancer, with O'Reily ordering his mentally challenged brother Cyril to kill Dr. Nathan's husband. Later, he kills Irish inmate Keenan for raping Dr. Nathan. By the end of the series, a romantic relationship exists between the two of them. O'Reily also finds purpose again for his own life sentence at Oz by taking care of his sick father, who abused both himself and Cyril in their youth, and who is also an inmate at Oz and who regrets his own life's actions though he misses the opportunity to see Cyril before his execution.
|-
| colspan="5" bgcolor="#6699CC" |
|-
|  || George Morfogen || 1, 2, 3, 4, 5, 6
|-
| colspan="5" | An elderly inmate serving life for murder. He was originally sentenced to death, but in 1965, he survived a botched electric chair execution when the power went off and his sentence was commuted. He is fantastically intuitive (some think as a result of the botched execution), which in the first couple of seasons he explains by nonchalantly saying "God told me"; later he begins doubting the source and veracity of his insights, however he even knows private details about prisoners' lives of which he had no prior knowledge. His calm personality is briefly replaced with more murderous fantasies when he suffers from a brain tumour. His grandson's battle with leukaemia makes him look for ways to find a cure. To raise the funds he asks a guard to buy him a lottery ticket and he wins with "God's" numbers only to be thwarted by the guard failing to share. By the time the guard had second thoughts, his grandson dies. When he is later smitten with the prison librarian, he finds out she has breast cancer and hardens his heart fearing the pain of another death. He comes around after being awakened by the admonition of a young inmate whom the librarian had also reached.
|-
| colspan="5" bgcolor="#C80815" |
|-
|  || Eamonn Walker || 1, 2, 3, 4, 5, 6
|-
| colspan="5" | Kareem Saïd is a charismatic Muslim leader with a powerful voice and a conviction that other people's racism will absolve him. In the first season, Saïd spends much of his time converting other inmates to his cause, even many of the Homeboys, much to the anger of Adebisi. In the end of Season 1, he orchestrates a riot with the Muslims and takes charge of Emerald City. He fancies himself a lawyer and tries to help other inmates by representing them, with mixed results. His more liberal views see him deposed as the leader of the Muslims though he regains the position after Arif recognises his own deficiencies as a leader. After killing Adebisi in self-defense, he struggles with personal demons and inner anger, frequently lashing out at the Aryans, which he tries to overcome by mentoring volatile inmate Omar White. He is shot and killed by Lemuel Idzik, who kills him because of a conversation over a cup of coffee that ruined Idzik's life many years before.
|-
| colspan="5" bgcolor="#E89100" |
|-
|  || Kirk Acevedo || 1, 2, 3, 4, 5, 6
|-
| colspan="5" | On and off leader of the Latino inmates in the prison, Miguel Alvarez has a family background of Latino Gang-life, with his father Eduardo and grandfather Ricardo both incarcerated in Oz. After running the Latinos with little incident, his life spirals out of control in season 2 with the arrival of Hernandez. Hernandez forces him to blind Officer Rivera and he is sent to solitary. He also makes an enemy of Warden Glynn for concealing the identity of the man who raped Glynn's daughter. He escapes Oz through one of Busmalis' tunnels and remains on the run for 6 months, eventually recaptured on the border with Mexico. He spends most of his time in Oz in and out of solitary and survives several attempts on his life by Guerra, a fellow Latino inmate. On his final release from solitary, he abandons the gang life and works towards parole. He participates in the guide dog program and trains a bilingual dog for Rivera, somewhat burying the hatchet between them. After a Latino parole board member swears that Alvarez will never be released, he loses heart about being freed, returns to drugs and is swallowed up again by Oz by the end of the series.
|-
| colspan="5" bgcolor="#228B22" |
|-
| Cyril O'Reily || Scott William Winters || 2, 3, 4, 5, 6
|-
| colspan="5" | Ryan O'Reily's brain damaged and mentally-challenged brother. He was severely mentally incapacitated in a gang-related fight with Ryan and remains unfailingly loyal to his brother. He is incarcerated after blindly following Ryan's orders to murder the husband of Dr. Nathan, with whom Ryan is obsessed. On his arrival into Oz, he is raped by Schillinger, which destroys the alliance O'Reily had previously held with the Aryan. Throughout his time in the prison, as his brother does what best to take care of him, he also often guarded Ryan from danger from other inmates due to his talent for fighting. He kills an inmate to defend his brother, but gets sent to death row and is finally executed, after a long legal battle.
|-
| colspan="5" bgcolor="#6699CC" |
|-
| Chris Keller || Christopher Meloni || 2, 3, 4, 5, 6
|-
| colspan="5" | A bisexual serial killer and psychopath who preys upon gay men in the outside world while hiding his sexual orientation through a series of marriages. He is a master of emotional manipulation and only seems to really enjoy himself when those who care about him are made to suffer, including Beecher and Sister Pete. After being recruited by Schillinger to seduce and destroy Beecher, he falls for Beecher and their relationship remains an integral part of the series. They alternate through periods of affection and animosity, such as when Keller takes the fall for having Schillinger's son murdered but also sets up Beecher for violating parole to get him returned to Oz. This act turns Beecher against Keller for good. In an attempt to regain his love, he switches a prop knife with a real one, allowing Beecher to kill Schillinger during a performance of the play Macbeth. Despite this, Beecher still rejects him and Keller commits suicide by throwing himself off the balcony in Em City, making it appear that Beecher pushed him. It is then revealed that he had a toxic substance mailed to Oz and released into the mail room, wiping out the remaining Aryans and requiring the whole prison to be evacuated with it being implied it shut down for good.
|-
| colspan="5" bgcolor="#000000" |
|-
| Simon Adebisi || Adewale Akinnuoye-Agbaje || 1, 2, 3, 4
|-
| colspan="5" | A gigantic, deranged maniac of Nigerian descent; incarcerated for decapitating a police officer with a machete. His flirtations with insanity and religion are transient, and similar to the Aryans, he later-on carried a somewhat racist belief towards Whites, believing them responsible for any cruel events towards his people. He grows in prominence in seasons 3 and 4 when he manipulates racial tension within the prison to force Warden Glynn to hire a black man to run Em City. This new manager, Querns, allows Adebisi to indulge any drug or sexual desire in return for preventing violence within the unit. This allows Adebisi to become the most powerful inmate in Oz and creates his own version of paradise. His reign is brought to an end by Saïd, who stabs him to death in self-defense.
|-
| colspan="5" bgcolor="#000000" |
|-
| Arnold "Poet" Jackson || muMs da Schemer || 1, 2, 3, 4, 5, 6
|-
| colspan="5" | An African-American inmate with a talent for poetry. He is often seen reciting his poetry in the cafeteria and his poems provide insight into some of the current prison issues. McManus and Saïd have his work published in order to promote McManus' prison education program and he is granted early parole. However his addiction to heroin means he quickly violates his parole and he is sent back to Oz. He claims to have a knack for "picking winners and losers", which probably explains his shifting alliances and ability to stay alive. Upon his return to Oz, he is friends with Wangler and Pierce until their deaths and helps Saïd bring down Adebisi. He then tries to lead the Homeboys but is ineffective and quickly cedes control to the more competent Redding, becoming one of his most loyal lieutenants. He again leads the Homeboys while Redding is distracted following Hill's death and later unsuccessfully tries to convince Neema to lead them. He reluctantly becomes a telemarketer when Redding pulls the Homeboys from the drug trade but finds a way to scam his respondents with the help of his cousin. He is one of the inmates present in the season pilot to survive to the finale.
|-
| colspan="5" bgcolor="#000000" |
|-
| Kenny Wangler || J. D. Williams || 1, 2, 3, 4
|-
| colspan="5" | One of the youngest inmates in Oz, Wangler (nicknamed "Bricks") was sixteen when he committed murder and was tried as an adult. Wangler exhibits the qualities of a juvenile delinquent: cocky, hot-headed and sadistic. He is also illiterate and a father without knowing any life skills such as parenting, shown in the third season during his interactions with his crying son and not knowing how to react. He often bullies and intimidates other inmates despite his age and size, including his fellow African-American cellmate Poet (who he eventually made peace with) and the elderly Rebadow. He is good at making businesses within the Homeboys, mainly with selling drugs, and often makes good business ventures with O'Reily and the Italians. He has a Love–hate relationship with the Gang's in-and-out leader Adebisi, and their relationship goes further in the second and third seasons where Adebisi treats Wangler as his subordinate. His usual prison routine of intimidation ends up being his downfall when inmate Guillaume Tarrent, a bullying target of Wangler and his fellow Homeboys, murders him and his associate Pierce with a pistol.
|-
| colspan="5" bgcolor="#E3DAC9" |
|-
| James Robson || R.E. Rodgers || 2, 3, 4, 5, 6
|-
| colspan="5" | As the Lieutenant of the Aryan Brotherhood, Robson is similar to their leader, Schillinger, as he enjoys harassing others that are not of the brotherhood. He is just as brutal, willing to kill anyone without provocation. He is convicted for murdering a black man whom he spotted walking with his girlfriend. Over the course of the show, Robson evolves from a secondary character into a central character with a storyline of his own. His lack of oral hygiene becomes his undoing in Season 5 when his Arabic dentist transplants a black man's tissue into his gums as a cadaver in response to his racially charged comments. Upon discovery, the rest of the Aryans, including Schillinger, cast him out. Desperate for protection from the many non-white inmates and enemies he has, Robson becomes a willing prag of Wolfgang Cutler, who rapes and sexually humiliates him in front of other inmates. Robson eventually breaks free of Cutler's slavery, as he tricks him into hanging himself during erotic auto-asphyxiation. Robson's role in the Brotherhood returns, but not long after he begins to have haunting memories of his rape carried-out by Cutler, which reminded him of being raped by his own abusive father as a child. Reflecting on his past, Robson begins to see much of his actions in Oz as a result of his conditioning. After being diagnosed as HIV positive, Robson confesses that he had brought much of the actions on himself for his cruelty in the past, and he decides to turn against the Brotherhood. Robson allows himself to be raped on purpose by black inmate Seroy. Disgusted in his actions and labelling him a race traitor, Schillinger expels Robson from the Brotherhood. This act saves his life as he becomes the only Aryan to survive Keller's mailroom attack.
|-
| colspan="5" bgcolor="#6699CC" |
|-
| Shirley Bellinger || Kathryn Erbe || 2, 3, 4, 6
|-
| colspan="5" | Known as the first and only woman on the prison's Death Row for murdering her daughter by driving into a river. She is unfailingly friendly and sexually aggressive, despite her 'good girl' persona. After starting a correspondence relationship with Adebisi, she rejects him upon meeting him and discovering he is black. This racist belief is later absent when she meets inmate Deyell. Her first stay on death row is commuted when it is discovered she is pregnant and though the father is never identified, she claims it was Satan and she is sent to a mental hospital. She returns after inducing a miscarriage and befriends Deyell and Ginsberg, though clashes with Miles. She chooses death by hanging and her calm demeanor finally fails her upon seeing the gallows. She is executed screaming and crying. She is the only one of the four death row inmates to be executed as planned. Despite her death, much like Hill, she came back in spirit in the sixth season to help narrate one of the episodes. Like Robson, she was only one of the few main inmates who never was put in Em City.
|-
| colspan="5" bgcolor="#6699CC" |
|-
|  || Michael Wright || 4, 5, 6
|-
| colspan="5" | White is an African-American drug addict who murdered a key witness against his cousin in front of her daughter's eyes. White proves to be very troublesome throughout his stay at Oz, most of which ends up with him in solitary confinement. Omar is violent and somewhat childish and has never lost a fight to anyone in Oz besides Saïd. Unit Manager Tim McManus believes he can help White until he messes up for a last time in Season 5 where he ends up in solitary again. He eventually gains control of himself and displays a talent for singing. Idzik, believing in the futility of life, asks White to kill him. White refuses, so Idzik kills White in order to be sent to Death Row.
|-
| colspan="5" bgcolor="#6699CC" |
|-
|  || Tom Mardirosian || 2, 3, 4, 5, 6
|-
| colspan="5" | Named after the mythological Greek king Agamemnon. Since early childhood, he had a fascination with digging. Outside of prison, he was known as "The Mole," having been an expert at digging tunnels to commit various robberies. He makes several attempts to escape OZ by digging tunnels, escaping for only a day before he is recaptured. He is good friends with the fellow elderly inmate Rebadow. After returning to Oz following his escape, Rebadow feels betrayed that Busmalis escaped without him and, coupled with violent fantasies due to a brain tumour, Rebadow unsuccessfully tries to kill him. They reconcile soon afterwards. He is paired with Vahue for the basketball matches and though very ineffective, he does manage to score one goal. He has never been with a woman sexually, and is a huge fan of the children's show Ms. Sally's Schoolyard. Every time the inmates are watching the show, Busmalis can be heard saying "This is the best Miss Sally ever." He writes her fan letters and a woman claiming to be Miss Sally visits him in Oz, though it turns out to be a production assistant named Norma Clark. They fall in love and eventually marry.
|}

 Other inmates 
 The Aryans 
The Aryans are a fierce gang. Led through the whole series by the charismatic Vernon Schillinger. They are racist, nationalist, tough and like to have what are known in the series as "Prags" (The show's term for a "Bitch"). They, and mostly Schillinger himself, take up most of the Oz rape statistic. Curiously they rarely have feuds with the Homeboys but rather with the Muslims. The Aryans were in a perpetual alliance with the Bikers, had a CO on their "payroll," and were a force to be reckoned with.
  (Leif Riddell) – An inmate in Emerald City and Schillinger's lieutenant. He helps Schillinger murder Vogel and later rapes Hanlon. When he discovers Busmalis' tunnel, he forces them to switch cells and attempts to escape through the tunnel. He and a fellow escaping inmate are killed when the tunnel collapses on top of them.
  (Frederick Koehler) – Eldest son of Vernon Schillinger. He originally shares his father's white supremacist views, though not his intolerance of drugs. He is sent to Em City and rooms with Beecher. Beecher, Keller and O'Reily see this as an opportunity to get back at Schillinger. Beecher recognises him as a fellow victim of Schillinger and helps him off heroin, in the process turning him against his father. Andrew eventually denounces the Aryan ideals to his father, attacks him and is sent to the hole. Schillinger has Lopresti bring him a lethal amount of heroin and after some reluctance, Andrew takes the drugs and overdoses. Despite the 'success' of their plan, Beecher shows considerable remorse for his part in Andrew's death.
  (Chazz Menendez) – A background Aryan, often seen antagonizing other inmates such as Beecher and O'Reily. He also sponsors Andrew Schillinger. He participates in the drug trial and suffers a fatal side effect in the middle of a conversation with Hoyt. His family subsequently sue the prison.
  (Michael Quill) – An inmate on Death Row. His Aryan views mean he is unwilling to befriend the other inmates on Death Row: Deyell (black) and Ginzberg (gay). He is a talented artist and paints a self-portrait on his cell wall. His repeated abuse of neighbouring inmate Deyell leads Deyell to dig through the cell wall between them, finally breaking through and strangling Miles to death, destroying the portrait in the process.
  (Joshua Harto) – A young inmate tasked with murdering Saïd, he instead kills Leroy Tidd and is sent to solitary. Cloutier visits him and attempts to get him to confess to Robson's involvement. The Brotherhood finds out and threatens him, causing him to hang himself in his cell.
  (Andy Powers) – A friend of Adam Guenzel's. He is sent to Unit B and quickly becomes a prag of the Aryans and is forced to wear women's clothes and makeup. However, he strives to move up the ranks and is accepted as a full member after he murders Beecher's father. Keller realises his crime and seduces him, before snapping his neck.

 The Bikers 
The Bikers are, for the most part, some of the toughest inmates. They are also Schillinger and the other Aryans' allies and as such, share at least some of his thoughts on race, religion, etc. Jaz Hoyt is their leader.
  (Stephen Gevedon) – A friend of Whittlesey's ex-husband and Schillinger. He transfers into Em City, where is also befriends O'Reily. He starts a cigarette racket with Whittlesey and threatens her when she tries to break it off. During the riot, he shoots McManus but is then murdered by Whittlesey. Despite several other people discovering her crime, it is covered up and Whittlesey is never punished for his murder.
  (Evan Seinfeld) – The leader of the Bikers for the majority of the series. Despite his brutality, he suggests inmates raise money to send Rebadow's grandson to Disney World. He is not particularly bright and is often manipulated by other inmates, most commonly O'Reilly. He tries to kill Stanislofsky over Galino's cellphone, orchestrates Cloutier's imprisonment in the kitchen wall and kills Burns in self-defense when Burns tries to kill Kirk. Hoyt then receives a vision from Cloutier, telling him to kill Kirk. Though Kirk survives this attempt, Hoyt is haunted by Cloutier and confesses to a series of other murders, resulting in his transfer to Death Row. Once there, he finally kills Kirk but immediately goes insane and his death sentence is commuted. On the eve of his transfer to a mental hospital, he is killed by another biker.
  (Peter James Kelsch) – A background character in seasons two and three, he takes more prominence in season four when he is converted by Cloutier. He and Kirk try to convert other inmates by force. After Kirk is exiled by Cloutier and Cloutier is injured by the kitchen blast, he sees a vision of Cloutier, telling him to kill Kirk. He tries, and is killed by Hoyt in the process.
  (Mike Arotsky) – Another background biker, he often seen alongside Hoyt, but after Hoyt confessed all of his murders that he was never found guilty with before, he took the role in the gang as leader, helping lure Guenzel into one of Schillinger's traps of Sexual Assault.

 The Christians 
The Christians are perhaps the most quiet of all the groups in Oz, but they get a voice when Jeremiah Cloutier entered the fold. Cloutier converted Biker Jim Burns and got close to Vern Schillinger, but unfortunately these connections proved fatal when he banished Timmy Kirk from his congregation. Timmy Kirk was using the flock to extort and punish inmates he considered wicked, but was indeed wicked himself, and eventually turned to Satanism before finally being killed by Jaz Hoyt on his second attempt. Other notable members include William Cudney, who shot the child of a doctor who had aborted his wife's fetus, and Robert Sippel, a pedophile priest, who was eventually nailed by Schillinger and the Aryans.
  (Bryan Callen) – A former teacher, he is appointed the teacher for Em City's short-lived GED program. He clashes frequently with Wangler in his attempts to educate him.
  (David Lansbury) – A former priest imprisoned for child molestation, he is paroled and finds life on the outside difficult. He moves back into Oz because he cannot find housing or a job, so Mukada hires him as an assistant. Shortly after, he is crucified to the gym floor by the Aryans.
  (William Cote) – Serving life without parole for killing the child of a doctor who performed an abortion on Cudney's partner (reasoning a child's life for a child's life). He and the other Christian inmates in Em City try to stop the inmates from watching Miss Sally's Schoolyard, since they are only interested in her breasts. He steals drugs from the hospital for O'Reily but later decides to turn them both in. O'Reily quickly hires Kosygin to murder him and Cudney bleeds out after being stabbed in the neck.
  (Vincent D'Abouze) – A young, attractive black man, who is sponsored by Adebisi. During Querns tenure, all of the Christian inmates besides Vincent are transferred out of Em City. Adebisi then dominates Vincent, forcing him to wear ladies clothing and dance for him.
  (Luke Perry) – A former televangelist preacher, arrested for stealing from his church. He initially engages in a battle for the souls of Oz's inmates with Mukada though they eventually find common ground. He converts Kirk, who then grows violently devout. When he exiles Kirk, Kirk retaliates by having the Bikers humiliate Cloutier and seal him in the kitchen wall. When a gas blast destroys the kitchen, Cloutier survives and is found with severe burns. He recovers in the hospital and after appearing to several inmates as visions, he disappears. Months later, Hoyt confesses to hiding him back in the wall, where his skeletal remains are found by Mukada.
 Father  (Malachy McCourt) – A Catholic priest, arrested for assaulting a police officer at a protest that turned violent. He attempts to counsel O'Reily while Cyril is fighting to avoid execution. He dies of a brain aneurysm. Schibetta later claims to O'Reily that he put the 'Evil Eye' on Meehan to cause his death. His death causes O'Reily to regain his faith.

 The Gays 
The Gays are the most non-violent gang in the prison and they stick together. They do not seem to have a leader but Fiona and Ray Masters are the front figures. Despite usually being in the background, they have had some notable members. Richie Hanlon was a kind individual who was shafted by the Aryans, and Jason Cramer was the only inmate who was ever released and stayed out. Nat Ginzburg was known for killing the former Sicilian leader Antonio Nappa. Alonso Torquemada who entered late in the series, seemed the perfect leader with tons of ambition, but by then the show was declared to be over.
  (Derrick Simmons) – Jefferson Keene's brother. He is beaten and hospitalised by Ortolani but recovers. Despite his homosexual status being at odds with Jefferson's newfound Islamic ideals, they make peace shortly before Jefferson's execution.
  (Jordan Lage) – A good-natured inmate. He overhears Alvarez talking about Glynn's daughter's rape and alerts Mukada. He is later raped by Mack and accidentally kills inmate Freakie who subsequently approaches him for sex. He tries to give up Mack for Vogel's murder but is blackmailed into taking the blame himself and is sent to Death Row. He and Bellinger bond, with her attempting to make him a sweater. He manages to beat the murder charge and is sent back to Em City. He is immediately killed by Stanislofsky, a friend of Vogel, who mistakenly believed Hanlon was responsible for his death.
  (Steve Wishnoff) – A background character, he is often seen with fellow Gays, Fiona Zonioni and Downing. However, by the sixth and final season, he is shown to be Torquemada's henchman.
  (James Palacio) – A background character, often seen with Tony Masters, but however did interact with Busmalis, as he asks Zonioni to read a letter from Norma Clark, his fiancé, in a feminine voice and reacts pleasantly to it.
  aka Downings (Rohan Quine) – Usually a background character, though he speaks in Season 4 Episode 2 "Obituaries", to voice his indignation when Jason Cramer tells his fellow Gays in the dining hall about the jury's homophobic prejudice during Cramer's trial (but Downing is glad when Cramer adds that this prejudice may get Cramer's sentence overturned). 
  (Robert T. Bogue) – The Gay inmates' representative in the boxing tournament. He makes it to the semi-final, where he is narrowly beaten by Khan. After discussing the homophobic bias in his murder trial with Saïd, they are able to get him a retrial. Despite his guilt, his conviction is overturned when it is revealed the Detective planted false evidence and he is released, making him one of the few inmates to leave Oz for good.
 Nathaniel 'Nat' Ginzburg (Charles Busch) – Nappa's cellmate in the ward for HIV-positive inmates. He helps Nappa with his memoirs and cooks him dinner, but then smothers him on orders from Pancamo. He is sent to Death Row where he befriends Bellinger and Deyell. As his health declines from AIDS, he requests his execution be brought forward but he succumbs to the disease the night before his rescheduled execution.
 Alonzo Torquemada (Bobby Cannavale) – A nightclub owner, sent to Oz for throwing acid at another man. He comes into Oz selling D-tabs, a type of designer drug. He ingratiates himself with both the Italians and the Latinos, and gets them both addicted to his pills. He is attracted to Alvarez and continually tries to seduce him, succeeding when a depressed Alvarez is denied parole.

 The Gangstas 
The Gangstas or the Homeboys are a black gang in Oz and have the most members compared to other gangs. They also however suffer the most losses, although many of them are due to internal struggles. They are the least religious group and the most drug affected.
  (Leon Robinson) – The original leader of the Homeboys, serving life without parole for killing a couple on their wedding day. He loathes the Wiseguys, especially after Ortolani beats his brother Billie. Despite the escalating war between the Homeboys and the Sicilians, he grows disillusioned with his gangster life and converts to Islam, taking the name Tizi Ouzou. Worried that Keene will reveal his involvement in several murders, O'Reily arranges for Keene to be sent to Death Row after he is manipulated into killing another inmate in a gladiator-style arena. Before he dies, he donates a kidney to his sister. At peace with his life, he apologises for his crimes, reconciles with his family and is executed.
  (Tim McAdams) – A drug dealer, serving life. He is tasked by Keene with killing Ortolani. He pays a CO to let him into the cell in which a sedated Ortolani lies and immolates him. O'Reily later gives up Post to Schibetta and he is beaten and mutilated by the Sicilians. His severed penis is later sent to Keane’s cell in a box.
  (O.L. Duke) – Originally claimed to be Glynn's cousin, he is actually an undercover police officer, sent into Oz to shut down the drug trade. He befriends Keane, Abebisi and Wangler. However, his duplicity is discovered and he is hanged in the gym.
  (Rick Fox) – A famous NBA basketball player, arrested for assaulting a woman. He initially struggles adapting to Oz due to his lack of status though he redeems himself after trying to help an injured prisoner during the riot. When McManus arranges a basketball tournament between himself and Vahue, he is partnered with Busmalis. Vahue and Busmalis win two of three matches, despite the meddling of both inmates and officers. Vahue is eventually paroled. After returning to Oz for a publicity shoot, he brushes off Officer Brass who later makes a failed attempt on Vahue's life.
  (Lexington Alexander) – A friend of Wangler and Poet. He arranges one of his contacts to murder Wangler's wife and lover and is later severely injured when Adebisi pours boiling soup on his face. He is killed by Tarrant.
 Malcolm "Snake" Coyle (Anthony 'Treach' Criss) – A friend of Wangler's sent to Em City for armed robbery. In an attempt to impress and earn Hill's respect, Snake boasts to Hill that he murdered a family, including a baby. Hill later uses this information to bring a conviction against him but before he can be tried, Nappa organises his murder.
 Kevin "Supreme Allah" Ketchem (Lord Jamar) – Ran in the same gang as Redding and Hill, though he gave up Hill to the cops, leading to them both despising him. He aligns himself with Adebisi and takes significant control while Querns controls Em City. He is framed for the murders of Shemin and Browne though he escapes conviction. He tries to start an uprising against Redding with the help of Hill and Daniels, but Hill and Poet use his fatal allergy of eggs to kill him.
 Raymond "Mondo" Browne (Gano Grills) – One of the inmates transferred to Em City during Querns' tenure. He rooms with Beecher and they sleep together. He is seduced and killed by Keller and his murder is pinned on Supreme Allah.
 Carlton "Tug" Daniels (Method Man) – The brother of the man Supreme Allah was incarcerated for killing. Poet tries to have him kill Supreme Allah, though he survives and Daniels is sent to Oz. He and Supreme Allah then team up to take control of the Homeboys from Redding. His treachery is uncovered and he is killed by the Homeboys after a mock trial.
  (Jacques C. Smith) – A friend of Adebisi's during the black takeover of Em City. He offers to kill Saïd for the Aryans due to Saïd killing Adebisi. He feigns conversion to Islam, taking the name Salah Udeen, but finds he cannot kill Saïd and his conversion becomes genuine. The Aryans then have Jenkins try to kill Saïd, though Tidd protects Saïd and is killed in his place.
  (Erik King) – A Death Row inmate, awaiting execution for murdering his lover and her husband. He befriends Bellinger and Ginsberg. After Bellinger's execution and Ginsberg's death, he is left with only the racist Miles for company. After tiring of Miles' taunts, he digs a hole through their adjoining wall and strangles him to death. He later tries to befriend Giles but is irritated by the latter's nonsensical speech patterns. He requests his organs be donated after his execution and meets the intended recipients. During a transfer to the hospital for a checkup, he attempts escape and is shot to death.
  (Anthony Chisholm) – The leader of Hill and Supreme Allah's gang. He acts as a father figure for Hill but despises Supreme Allah. He takes control of the Homeboys from Poet after Adebisi's death and refuses to align with the Latinos and the Sicilians. He tries to start a rumble with the Latinos and the Sicilians, but Hill tips off the officers, leading to their estrangement. He welcomes Hill back after Hill arranges Supreme Allah's death. He is devastated by Hill's death and neglects his leadership duties. He eventually regains control and tries to pull the Homeboys from the drug trade by having them work as telemarketers, with mixed results.
  (Mtume Gant) – A background member of the Homeboys. He proves to be very effective while working as a telemarketer.

 The Irish 
The Irish are perhaps the smallest gang in Oz based on membership, mostly driven by the schemes of Ryan O'Reily. As a gang they might appear to be insignificant, but Ryan O'Reily manages to factor into most major plots throughout the series.
  (Sean Dugan) – A background character in seasons 2 and 3, he is mainly seen assisting O'Reily or antagonising Wangler in the GED program. Originally a Catholic inmate, he is converted to Protestantism by Cloutier and becomes aggressively devout. He attempts to forcibly convert other inmates and is exiled by Cloutier. He also becomes an enemy of Mukada after Mukada refuses to welcome him back into a Catholic church. He is sent to Death Row for organising the arson of a church that killed two priests, where he then converts to Satanism. Despite surviving several attempts on his life, Hoyt finally manages to electrocute him with a photography lamp.
  (Seth William Meier) – Often seen as O'Reily's lieutenant, he helps O'Reily with schemes throughout the prison. He is recommended for parole towards the end of the series but is unsuccessful and dulls the disappointment by getting high on Bukowski's pot brownies.
  (Dylan Chalfy) – Convicted for the rape of Dr. Nathan. Though originally thought that O'Reily put him up to it, he attacked Nathan randomly. O'Reily makes 'an exception' to never killing people himself and kills Keenan with a dumbbell. Though Arif witnesses this and tells Glynn, O'Reily manages to pin the murder on Stanton and the multiple suspects means no one is punished for his murder.
  (Brían F. O'Byrne) – An IRA member, briefly held in Oz awaiting deportation to Britain. With O'Reily's help, he attempts to build a bomb but it fails to detonate. Ironically, Oz is heavily damaged by a gas explosion in the kitchen soon after.
  (Kevin Conway) – Ryan and Cyril O'Reily's abusive father. First seen when O'Reily organises a visit, knowing that he will get Cyril angry enough to defeat Khan in the boxing match final. He is later sent to Oz for murder and O'Reily eventually makes peace with him, taking care of him after he is injured by Neema.

 The Sicilians 
The Sicilians, also known as the "Wiseguys", are one of the most powerful gangs. In the beginning of the series, they run the drug trade with an iron fist, but because of Ryan O'Reily and Simon Adebisi, they lost their leader Nino Schibetta and control of the drug trade. Schibetta's son, Peter, failed to take it back, but under Antonio Nappa they finally got back a lot of their power. Adebisi caused trouble again for them however by stabbing Nappa with an AIDS-infected needle and thus infecting Nappa with HIV. When the prospect of a slow death caused Nappa to need to confess his crimes through his autobiography, he was ordered killed by the next leader, Chucky Pancamo. Pancamo then led the Wiseguys for the rest of the series, only with brief interlude when he was stabbed by Robson and almost died from a staph infection.
  (Tony Musante) – The original leader of the Sicilians in Oz. He runs the drug trade in the prison. He gets into business with the Homeboys. O'Reily and Adebisi slowly kill him by putting ground glass in his food.
 Dino Ortolani (Jon Seda) – A volatile inmate and Nino Schibetta's Lieutenant. He is incarcerated for attempting to kill O'Reily (and successfully killing his friend) and the two immediately clash on O'Reily’s arrival to Oz. Despite his brutality, he shows interest in Saïd's peaceful way of life, rejects praise from the Aryans for beating up a gay, black man and euthanises a dying Latino patient at his request. This final act results in him being sent to the hole and sedated. He is then burned and murdered by Post, on orders from O'Reily and Keane. In a final twist, O'Reily then moves into Em City and takes Ortolani's old pod.
  (Goodfella Mike G) – He assists Schibetta in running the kitchen, until he is hospitalised following an assault from the Homeboys.
  (Eddie Malavarca) – Sent to Oz for money laundering and extortion. He attempts to fill father's shoes and though he has the loyalty of the Sicilians, he makes numerous mistakes. He is raped by Adebisi and the trauma causes a mental breakdown, leading to him spending 4-years in the psych ward. When he returns, he continues his campaign for respect, but is raped by Schillinger and the Aryans and suffers another mental breakdown and is sent back to the psych ward. Almost 1-year later, Schibetta returns and is transferred to General Population. Schibetta later claims to have killed Father Meehan via a Sicilian curse called “The Evil Eye”. He then threatens Suzanne, O’Reily’s mother, with the curse. O'Reily manipulates Pancamo and the Sicilians into killing Schibetta.
 Chucky Pancamo (Chuck Zito) – Originally Peter Schibetta's and then Nappa's backup, he takes leadership of the Sicilians after they are both removed from Em City. Despite his admiration, he arranges the death of Nappa when it is revealed Nappa is writing his memoirs and could reveal mafia secrets. He represents the Sicilians in the boxing tournament, though he is drugged and beaten by Cyril O’Reily. He is shown to be willing to help anyone for a price, including arranging the death of Hank Schillinger. Pancamo is then stabbed during a brawl with the Aryans and nearly dies from a staph infection. He recovers, rejoins the Sicilians and is manipulated by O'Reily into killing Schibbetta.
  (Mark Margolis) – Takes control of the Sicilians after Schibetta's rape and breakdown. He wields considerable power within the prison, being able to arrange for Adebisi to be caught with drugs in his system and arranging Coyle's murder. Adebisi secretly infects him with HIV and he is transferred to Unit E, the AIDS ward. Faced with the end of his life, he decides to write his memoirs. Pancamo is afraid he could reveal mafia secrets and arranges for Nappa's cellmate Ginzberg to smother him in his sleep.
 Frank "The Fixer" Urbano (Antoni Corone) – An occasional leader of the Sicilians. He attempts to kill Redding though kills Hill instead. He later assists Pancamo in killing Schibetta.

 The Latinos 
The Latinos, also known as "El Norte", are one of the three main players in the drug trade along with the Italians and Homeboys. They tend to have an easier relationship with the Italians rather than the Homeboys, although they have cooperated with both. Besides drugs, they also deal in alcohol and medical supplies via their members doing work detail as orderlies. Miguel Alvarez led the gang in the beginning, then El Cid Hernandez took over and forced Alvarez into proving himself by sticking out the eyes of a CO. This landed Alvarez in solitary where he went in and out through the series. Chico Guerra was the perpetual lieutenant, both to Hernandez and Morales. Guerra had a long rivalry and vendetta to Alvarez, but made peace in the end. After Morales died, nobody stepped up to lead.
  (Jose Soto) – Sanchez was an AIDs infected patient, who homophobic Italian member, Dino Ortolani, knew while working the AIDs ward as a punishment for his homophobic-related assaults, the two bond while talking about their children despite Ortolani constantly criticising Sanchez's homosexual status. He asks Ortolani to help him die, a request Ortolani eventually grants and he is suffocated.
  (Tomas Milian) – Eduardo's father and Miguel's grandfather. He was sent to Oz when Eduardo was a baby and did not see his son again until he was sent to Oz as well. He killed a Haitian inmate who cut out Eduardo's tongue and was sent to solitary and was eventually able to meet his grandson. He develops Alzheimers and dies offscreen.
  (José Ramón Rosario) – Ricardo's son and Miguel's father who has been in Oz most of Miguel's life. Soon after being sent to Oz, he had his tongue cut out by a Haitian inmate for being abusive. He works as an orderly in the prison hospital with his son and together, they care for a dying Ricardo. Alvares comes to him when Hernandez orders him to blind Rivera and Eduardo shows frustration that he is unable to advise his son.
  (Jose Hernandez Jr.) – A background member of the Latinos, identifiable by his long, dark hair. He is present for the riot and is often seen with the other Latinos, though he has no storylines. While Alvarez is briefly released from solitary, Vasquez attacks him but Alvarez slits his throat with a razorblade, killing him.
 Carmen "Chico" Guerra (Otto Sanchez) – The ever-present lieutenant of the Latinos. He was arrested for murder after he threw a dwarf off a bridge. He tires of Alvarez's inaction against other inmate groups that disrespect the Latinos. When Hernandez takes control of the Latinos, Guerra grows to hate Alvarez and constantly belittles and tries to kill him, even when Morales forbids it. He eventually gets over his hatred of Alvarez when all the other leading Latinos have been killed and is last shown tearing his own skin after getting high on Torquemada's pills.
 Raoul "El Cid" Hernandez (Luis Guzman) – An infamous Mexican gangster who takes over the Latinos shortly after his arrival.. Despite Alvarez's admiration, Hernandez considers him "too white" and consistently verbally abuses him, ultimately forcing him to blind Officer Rivera to prove himself. He leads the Latinos until Morales arrives, continuing to torment Alvarez. However, El Cid ultimately starts to realize how empty his life is and begins to regret his choices. However, in order to gain the respect of the Italians and Homeboys, as well as leadership of the Latinos, Morales arranges for Rebadow to kill Hernandez and claim self-defence.
  (Juan Carlos Hernández) – An inmate who is originally visited by many family members, though they drop off after time. He is selected to represent the Latinos in the boxing tournament but is disqualified after he is sent to solitary. He misses his final visit with his sister and is shown to be greatly depressed that he no longer has anyone visiting him. He attempts to kill Alvarez but dies in the process. Alvarez then falsely tells Glynn that Ricardo was responsible for raping Glynn's daughter. He is Bevilacqua's cousin.
  (David Zayas) – A soft-spoken, cunning inmate who takes control of the Latinos after arranging Hernandez's murder. He forms an alliance with Pancamo and Adebisi to control the drug trade but is forced out by Adebisi. He also arranges for Martinez to maim Officer Brass. Brass later fakes hearing a deathbed confession from Martinez that Morales ordered his attack and Morales is moved to solitary. He is attacked by Officers Brass, Howell and Murphy and injured in a similar way to Brass. While recovering in hospital, he alerts McManus to Nurse Grace before he is murdered by her. The Latinos are shown to be in disarray after his death.
  (G.A. Aguilar) – First introduced as an inmate in solitary. He was sent to Oz for murder, but it is unknown what got him sent to solitary. Alvarez reveals that Bevilacqua was the one who raped Glynn's daughter, not Ricardo as previously thought. As Ricardo's cousin, he attempts to kill Alvarez during an exercise period for the inmates in solitary but Giles takes his shank and kills him instead. Alvarez does not tell Glynn the real rapist's identity.
  (Carlos Leon) – First appears in the prison hospital when he unsuccessfully tries to kill Alvarez. He later slashes Officer Brass's Achilles tendon, ending his basketball career. He is sent to solitary but refuses to confess that Morales ordered the attack. While in solitary, he regularly has sex with Officer Howell. He falls ill and is transferred to the hospital. He assaults Dr Nathan during his checkup and she subsequently neglects his care. When he later dies, Dr Nathan blames herself but it is eventually revealed he was suffocated by Nurse Grace.
  (Christopher Rivera) – An inmate who allies himself with Alvarez when Alvarez is briefly released from solitary. He tries to kill Guerra in the showers and is killed in the attempt.
  (Michael Rivera) – A young inmate convicted of manslaughter after the gun he brought to school to show off fired and killed a classmate. He struggles with his anger but bonds with Stella when she gives him a book to read. When he is thrown in the hole for attacking an Aryan, Stella reads to him through the wall.

 The Muslims 
The Muslims are the most devout gang in Oz. They mostly stay away from violence and gang-related things. They are anti-drugs and against almost everything else that falls in that category. Kareem Saïd was their natural leader for almost the entire series, but his position was usurped by Hamid Khan (Ironically just after Saïd refused a pardon to be with his Muslim brothers). After Khan died in the boxing tournament, Arif took over but found he could not lead. Saïd took over leadership duties again but after he killed Adebisi in self-defense and convert Salah Udeen was killed by the Aryans, he had an angry period where he gave into violence a lot. When he came around again he started the book-binding business, and then suddenly, was shot by Lemuel Idzik. Arif took over after that, but again could not handle it. When the series ended it was not certain who was the leader. Huseni Mershah was more gang member-like but his effort to take over from Saïd failed and he was cast out. Saïd converted Jefferson Keane but he was set up by Ryan O'Reily fearing that he would inform on him. The Muslims had almost inevitably long-running tensions with the Aryans.
  (Granville Adams) – Saïd's lieutenant for the majority of the series. He is serving time for assault and possession of stolen goods. He is loyal, though he sides with Khan when he replaces Saïd as leader of the Muslims. After Khan's death, Arif takes charge of the Muslims but quickly realises he is not a leader and gives Saïd the position again. He is the only person to witness O'Reilly murder Keenan but his information does not lead to a conviction, thanks to O'Reilly's manipulation. He is forced to lead the Muslims again after Saïd's death and tries to run the printing press. However, he once again proves a weak leader and has the printing press burned to claim the insurance money.
  (Ra Hanna) – A Muslim inmate regularly seen as Saïd's chief bodyguard. He is mostly silent and steadfastly loyal to Saïd; he is last to leave the table when Khan ousts Saïd as leader of the Muslims and does so reluctantly. He seems briefly swayed by Supreme Allah but quickly returns to his Islamic beliefs. When it is revealed that Arif purposely had the printing press burned, he beats Arif.
  (Conrad Lindsey) – A background member of the Muslims. He is identifiable by his red kufi decorated with white shells.
  aka James Monroe Madison (Roger Guenveur Smith) – An inmate who favours a more violent approach to Islam than Saïd practices. His attempts to 'defend' their faith to other inmates only angers Saïd. When Saïd suffers a heart attack, Mershah leaves him to die, hoping to take over the Muslims. Saïd survives and exiles Mershah. When he is unable to find allies among either the Muslims or the Homeboys, he tries to give up Saïd to Glynn, leading to a shakedown in which many of the inmates lose drugs, weapons and privileges. All Em City's inmates turn against him and spit on him as he is transferred out of Em City. Soon after, he commits suicide.
  (Ernie Hudson Jr.) – Arrested for assault after severely beating a white man he caught raping a black woman. He disapproves of many of Saïd's actions, from meeting with Tricia Ross (a white woman), appointing a Jewish lawyer to lead the court case, and allowing Beecher to listen to the Muslim's Bible study. He eventually replaces Saïd as leader of the Muslims. He competes in the boxing tournament, easily defeating Wangler, narrowly beating Cramer and finally facing Cyril O'Reilly in the final. Cyril's final punch leaves him brain dead and his wife sues the prison and has him removed from life support.
  (Chris Gardner) – A young Muslim inmate. He sneaks a piece of bread during prayer and is nearly exiled by Saïd, but is allowed to remain. He is identified by the Aryans as the weakest member of the Muslims and subsequently murdered by Robson.

 The Others 
  (Sean Whitesell) – A cannibalistic inmate with a childlike demeanor and limited emotional range. He is incarcerated for murdering his parents; he ate his mother and claimed he was saving his father for Thanksgiving. He converts to Catholicism (liking the concept of eating flesh and drinking blood during the Eucharist), is constantly caught sneaking into the morgue, burns 'MOM' onto his hand and fears the dentist. He is impressed with Saïd's rhetoric and attempts to kill Glynn. He instead kills Officer Lawrence Smith and is sentenced to death. He requests death by firing squad. Smith's mother Loretta visits him prior to his execution and he breaks down after receiving her forgiveness, finally showing emotion. He attempts to dictate his final words in a letter to Loretta but no one hears what he says before he is executed, to Mukada's dismay.
  (Eric Roberts) – A Death Row inmate with a fondness for the Yo-yo. While awaiting execution for the rape and murder of one woman, he subsequently confesses to the murder of over 30 others. He explains to Mukada that he loves every woman he sees. However, he believes that when he loves them, they own him and he refuses to be owned.
  (Brian Tarantina) – An inmate imprisoned for burning down a fire station. He is an addict and it is seen attending Sister Pete's counselling sessions. He falls afoul of the Homeboys when he is unable to pay and tries to bring them down by informing on them. O'Reilly lets him bust his and Healy's drug smuggling business to gain favour with Nino Schibetta. O'Reilly admits to the officers that Poklewaldt was the informant on Healy, leading to them beating Poklewaldt. He survives and is occasionally seen in the background from then on.
  (Zuill Bailey) – A famed cellist, sent to Oz for murdering a rival. Hill is attracted to his talent and arranges another inmate to play with Dobbins while he practices. Vahue smashes the cello and a depressed Dobbins spends his time watching TV. He is stabbed during the riot and despite Vahue leaving Em City to get him help, he dies of his injuries.
  (Brian Smyj) – A Jewish inmate doing time for murder, and known for his sheer size. Killed by Schillinger and Mack as a 'roadkill', a random killing to show the other inmates that the Aryans are to be feared. Hanlon is forced to confess to the murder though he is not convicted. He is a friend of Stanislofsky.
  (Austin Pendleton) – An elderly inmate convicted in the 1960s for murder who has been living in solitary since 1995 for killing his cellmate Ron Bibi. He is obsessed with oral hygiene and speaks in riddles and morse code. Sister Pete eventually deciphers a series of words into a confession that he witnessed the murder of her husband Leonerd by Bibi. During a period of exercise for the solitary inmates, Giles kills Bevilacqua and is transferred to Death Row. He requests death by stoning. To avoid an uproar over such a barbaric execution method, Devlin orders Giles declared insane and returned to solitary. Giles jubilation at the commutation of his death sentence is shattered when he realises that his tiny solitary cell is not much better. He is released from solitary when the air proves toxic and he successfully defends himself against Alvarez, to the amusement of the other inmates.
  (LL Cool J) – An inmate who comes to Em City, claiming to be Governor Devlin's drug dealer. Saïd and McManus quickly publicise this to embarrass Devlin. Devlin easily disproves Walker's claims and McManus angrily transfers Walker out of Em City.
  (Zakes Mokae) – A Nigerian witch doctor, sent to Oz for criminally negligent homicide. He takes an interest in Adebisi and tries to get him to turn away from his life of drugs and indulgence. Though he succeeds somewhat, he is killed by Wangler in a show of good faith for Nappa. His death is blamed on Adebisi and causes Adebisi to have a mental breakdown.
  (Philip Casnoff) – A Russian inmate who maintains a prickly alliance with O'Reilly. His Em City sponsor is Busmalis. He murders Hanlon, thinking him responsible for the murder of his friend Vogel, narrowly survives an assassination attempt by Kosygin and acquires Galino's cellphone. He eventually loses the cellphone to O'Reilly and moves to protective custody. Querns warns O'Reilly not to let anything happen to Stanislofsky after he returns to Em City. O'Reilly instead has Stanislofsky killed before he returns to Em City, by having Officer Howell electrocute him in a bathtub.
  (Olek Krupa) – A Russian inmate who arrives in Oz with a reputation as a killer for hire. O'Reilly pays him to kill Cudney and later Pancamo has him try to kill Stanislofsky. Stanislofsky survives and Kosygin is put in the hole, later solitary confinement. A deleted scene sees him murdered by a member of the Russian Secret Police.
  (Lothaire Bluteau) – An inmate sent to Oz for destroying a statue in a museum. A diminutive man, he is sponsored by Hoyt, who promptly mugs him. He is also frequently picked on by Wangler, Pierce and Poet. After O'Reilly advises him to stand up for himself, he finds Adebisi's gun in his bed. The next time he is confronted by Wangler and his gang, Tarrant fires the gun, killing Wangler, Pierce, Lou Rath and Officer Joseph Howard, as well as wounding several others. He then turns the gun on himself.
  (Domenick Lombardozzi) – An Italian inmate sent to Oz after a building he designed collapsed and killed two people. With no mafia connections, the other Italian inmates abandon him. He manages to bring a cellphone into the prison, unaware it is against the rules. Stanislofsky offers to turn it in but keeps it for himself. After Galino is made aware of this, Stanislofsky organises his death by having the Bikers inject him with a lethal dose of heroin. Though his death is ruled as suicide, Hoyt eventually confesses to his murder.
 Johnny Basil aka Desmond Mobay) (Lance Reddick) – An undercover cop sent to Em City to shut down the drug trade. He eventually becomes accepted as a drug runner, though he becomes addicted to heroin and murders Goergen to get there. Hill identifies him as a cop and shames him into confessing to Goergen's murder. Basil is sent to Oz to serve his sentence and lives in Unit J (the Cop Unit) with Hughes and Yood. After insulting Hughes, Hughes murders him by stabbing him in the chest.
  (Harry O'Reilly) – A corrupt former cop, sent to Oz for murder. He recognises Basil and threatens to expose him if he does not protect Goergen from the other black inmates. Since Basil has been ordered to murder someone to prove his worth to the drug runners, he kills two birds with one stone by pushing Goergen down an elevator shaft.
  (David Johansen) – A Jewish inmate. Schillinger pays him to implicate Keller in the kidnapping of Beecher's children. He gives Beecher the false information in exchange for dental work for one of his own daughters. Keller pledges to kill him and after demanding protection from the Aryans, Shillinger also orders Robson to kill him. Robson and Keller corner Zabitz in a storage room and the stress causes him to have a fatal heart attack, to their amusement.
  – An inmate with whom Beecher becomes intimate. Later killed by Keller in an attempt to discredit Querns and get back at Beecher. His murder is pinned on Supreme Allah, though Beecher knows the truth.
 Ronald 'Ronnie' Barlog (Brian Bloom) – A friend of Keller's who is sent to Em City for car theft. He rooms with Beecher and Beecher seduces him. Keller also seduces him to get back at Beecher. Barlog is approached by Agent Taylor, who offers him a sentence cut in exchange for information about Keller murdering several gay men. After he seeks legal advice from Beecher, Beecher warns Keller and Keller snaps Barlog's neck.
  (Tom Ligon) – A resident in Unit J, though he was actually a small town sheriff rather than a cop. He befriends Basil and is antagonised by Hughes. He also pushes Howell down the stairs and takes Beecher's job as Sister Pete's assistant. He witnesses Bandt's murder but refuses to talk.
  (Joel West) – A drug addict, arrested for killing his playing partner during a darts game. He is recognisable for his long hair and tie-dyed shirts. Kenmin pays him to tell O'Reilly that Li Chen plans to rape his mother, though this is a ploy to provoke the brothers. O'Reilly then has the Latinos injure Shupe in an accident where he loses his right arm. He later tries to admit the truth about Kenmin and Cyril but he is deemed an unreliable witness and his testimony useless.
 Colonel  (John Doman) – A military Colonel, imprisoned for raping a female colleague. He is an alcoholic and is seen attending Sister Pete's counselling sessions. He rooms with Redding and the two bond over their military history in the Vietnam War. He overhears Daniels and Supreme Allah plotting to kill Redding and warns his cellmate. Redding tasks Galson with killing Morales, however Morales gets the upper hand and crushes him beneath an elevator.
  (John Lurie) – An inmate serving time for criminally negligent homicide, though it is unknown why he was sent to solitary. He initially helps Hughes in his attempt to declare solitary as the Republic of Huru, though he then protects Glynn and kills Hughes. He is transferred to Em City when solitary is evacuated and participates in the guide dog program. He teaches his dog to attack Officer Lopresti and is returned to solitary. He gets sick from the toxic air in solitary and attempts to sue the state.
  (M.G. Gong) – A Chinese inmate, convicted for drug trafficking. He originally attempts to kill Morales in revenge for the death of Bian Yixhue and is involved in Redding's unsuccessful war with the Latinos. He later becomes an enemy of O'Reilly. He goads Cyril into killing Li Chen, resulting in Cyril being sent to Death Row and eventually executed. O'Reilly then provokes Kenmin into a fight and assists the officers in violently subduing him. Since he attacked officers, Kenmin is thrown into solitary without medical attention and the officers later beat him to death.
  (Mike Doyle) – A family friend of Beecher's, sent to Em City along with his a friend Franklin Winthrop for raping a college girl. Beecher keeps him safe from the Aryans, but their friendship ends when the homophobic Guenzel finds out about Beecher's relationship with Keller. Schillinger offers Beecher an opportunity to see Keller in exchange for allowing the Aryans to rape Guenzel. Beecher agrees after Guenzel attacks him. Guenzel is transferred to Unit B and gang-raped by the Aryans. When Schillinger thinks Guenzel will tell the officers what has happened to him, he tricks Guenzel into trying to escape, and Guenzel is killed when he is electrocuted on the prison fencing.
  (Thomas G. Waites) – An inmate who befriends Cyril while they are both in protective custody. O'Reilly disapproves of this and tries to keep them apart. O'Reilly makes it appear Stanton is in love with Dr Nathan, frames him for Keenan's murder and has Montgomery corroborate this. Stanton attempts to kill Montgomery and is sent to solitary.
  (Peter Criss) – An inmate O'Reilly pays to say Stanton killed Keenan. O'Reilly then tells Stanton that Montgomery accused him, and Stanton stabs him in the neck. He survives but it not seen again.
  (Emanuel Yarbrough) – A morbidly obese inmate with a fondness for arson and rape. He is hired by Kirk to organise the arson of a church Mukada is visiting, resulting in the death of two priests. He tries to rape Winthrop and later rapes Robson. Robson allows this, as he knows he is HIV positive.
  (Nelson Lee) – A Chinese inmate used by Kenmin in his war with the O'Reilly brothers. He attempts to kill the O'Reilly brothers on Kenmin's orders and manages to stab Ryan. Cyril stabs him in the heart and is sentenced to Death.
  (Brendan Kelly) – An inmate doing time for murder. He tries to join the Brotherhood by killing Saïd but fails and is most commonly associated with the Bikers. Robson goes to him when he needs protection from his many enemies after being cast out of the Brotherhood, only to make him his so-called "Bitch". Cutler is briefly given the part of Macbeth in the prison play and considers Macbeth a 'pussy' for being unable to deal with murdering his king. Robson tricks Cutler into hanging himself during autoerotic asphyxiation, with his death being ruled suicide. For reasons unknown, his will leaves all of his possessions to Alvarez though Alvarez gives everything to Cutler's widow Cathy Jo.
  (Joel Grey) – Posing as a publisher for the release of Hill's memoirs, Idzik ambushes Saïd in the visiting room and shoots him. He is then sent to Oz. His Jewish faith alienates even the Aryans, who wanted to embrace him for killing their long-time enemy. He explains to White that many years ago, Saïd (while still known as Goodson Truman) spoke to him about how the universe would eventually end. Idzik was significantly affected by this information. He quit his job, abandoned his family and vowed to kill Saïd for ruining his life. He then asks White to kill him. White refuses, so Idzik kills White and is transferred to Death Row. His sentence is later commuted to life imprisonment, to his despair.
  (Peter Francis James) – An inmate arrested for kidnapping; his victim was his daughter of whom he did not have custody. He is a former Black Panther and lover of Suzanne Fitzgerald. O'Reilly initially hates him and tries to arrange his murder, though he gains respect when he organises a protest over Cyril's execution. The Homeboys unsuccessfully try to have him lead them as Redding is still distracted by Hill's death. Seamus O'Reilly attempts to kill Neema but Neema turns the knife on him and is subsequently sent to the hole.
 Mayor  (Tom Atkins) – Arrested after it is revealed he was involved in the death of two African American girls in the 1960s. Though he seems a friend of Devlin and Schillinger, he antagonises them both and they both turn their backs on him. Beecher saves him from choking, a factor that counts towards Beecher's successful parole bid. After Loewen threatens to expose Devlin's various crimes, Devlin arranges his murder. Willy Bandt slits his throat while he sleeps. Glynn later investigates the murder, and is killed when he gets too close to the truth.
  (Tony Hoty) – An inmate first seen in the prison hospital. He distracts the guards while Brandt murders Loewen. Kelsch then murders Brandt and Warden Glynn and is thrown in the hole when Stanton tells the officers. He quickly admits Officer Johnson orders the hits when threatened with starvation.
  – An inmate first seen in the hospital. He takes advantage of Kelsch's distraction and murders Mayor Loewen. He admits Officer Johnson's involvement to Glynn and is quickly murdered by Kelsch.
  (Ashley Hamilton) – A drug dealer. On arrival to Oz, his pot brownies become popular among the other inmates, which angers the existing drug dealing Italians. Pancamo uses the steam pipes in the kitchen to kill him and make it appear an accident.

 Prison staff 
The corrections officers (COs) are mostly white, with many black and some Latino officers. They range from kind and well-meaning to cruel and violent. Diane Wittlesy was the CO supervisor in Emerald City initially, then succeeded by Karl Metzger, Sean Murphy, Travis Smith and then Murphy again. Claire Howell excels in cruelty and sexual harassment, despite being a guard. Other staff members try their best to run the Penitentiary but sometimes get involved with the Inmates, such as main medic Dr. Nathan's relationship with O'Reily, and McManus always getting into complicating and overwhelming situations with several of the Inmates in his unit of Emerald City.
 Warden Leo Glynn (Ernie Hudson) – A conflicted person trying to maintain law and order in an often chaotic environment. He does what he can to manage every conflict present in Oz. Sister Pete calls him "the best man for the worst job." Appears in episodes 1–55.
  (Terry Kinney) – A hopeful idealist who forms Emerald City for purposes of making a perfect prison where rehabilitation and conflict are resolved. Often seen as weak for supposedly soft approaches to dealing with the inmates, he still manages to come out on top of many situations. Appears in episodes 1–26 and 28–56.
 Sister  (Rita Moreno) – A psychologist and nun, she is one of the main forces of good inside of the prison and often is helpful to McManus, Father Ray Mukada and Dr. Gloria Nathan in whatever conflict they are trying to solve. Gave serious thought to leaving the church after developing feelings for Chris Keller. Appears in episodes 1-56.
 Diane Whittlesey (Edie Falco) – A CO who is faced with managing several issues at home, a relationship with McManus, and being fair to the inmates. While on a holiday in London, she becomes engaged to a Buckingham Palace guard and does not return to Oz. Appears in episodes 1–18, 20–24.
  (Steve Ryan) – A disgruntled and corrupt officer, Healy has a very low opinion of both the inmates and Unit Manager Tim McManus. Healy is friends with inmate Ryan O'Reily and is a friend of Ryan's brother. Healy and O'Reily run a drug operation in Oz though O'Reily eventually sells him out in order to ingratiate himself with Nino Schibbetta. Healy is arrested and immediately fired.
  (Phillip Scozzarella) – An elderly Italian American CO. He is one of the few COs who is seen in every season. He is taken hostage in the Em City riot where he is savagely beaten by Miguel Alvarez and is then traded along with officer Armstrong in exchange for Tim McManus. He is often seen around Em City breaking up fights and counting inmates.
  (Timothy L. Brown) – A tall muscular CO who is mainly seen breaking up fights and patrolling. For the most part he is a good honest CO. He is one of the hostages in the Em City riot where he is seriously injured and is traded along with Joseph Mineo in return for Tim McManus
  (Murphy Guyer) – A CO who appeared in the first season of Oz. He was one of the officers on the firing squad who executed Donald Groves. He was a hostage during the Em City riot where he was killed by the SORT team.
  (Douglas Crosby) – A muscular CO and back-up SORT team member. He appears in all six seasons and is one of the hostages in the Em City riot. He tries to pass the time by telling terrible jokes, to the annoyance of the other hostages. Crosby was also one of the stunt coordinators for the show.
  (Ray Iannicelli) – An elderly officer regularly seen working the reception desk. He is very lax at his job, allowing many people to smuggle in contraband. After Idzik smuggles in a gun and kills Saïd, Glynn discovers Brese has been drunk on the job and is fired.
 Father  (BD Wong) – A Catholic priest and the main religious authority in Oz. Despite a promising start to his religious career, he was sent to Oz as punishment for clashing with the extremely conservative Cardinal Francis Abgott (Gavin MacLeod), under whom he was serving. Although it was forced upon him, he appears to grow into the role of a spiritual guide over time and firmly believes that his work is important. He provides spiritual counsel to many of the inmates, especially Miguel Alvarez. He later becomes an enemy of Kirk. After Kirk repeatedly attempts to ruin his life and career, Mukada's faith in people is severely shaken and he begins to pray for Kirk's death. Appears in episodes 2–46, 49–56.
 Dr.  (Lauren Velez) – A prison doctor who leads the prison hospital in providing care for the inmates within Oz. She regularly deals with conflict, both from inmates and from the state medical board. She assists O'Reily when he is diagnosed with breast cancer, leading to O'Reily falling in love with her and arranging the murder of her husband. Their interactions are decidedly hostile, though she comes to accept his love when he murders her rapist, Keenan. She eventually begins to return his feelings though they are rarely able to act upon them.
  (Skipp Sudduth) – A detective within Oz with ties to the Italian mafia. He is originally tasked with finding out who killed Ortolani and manipulates O'Reily into giving up Post, making him one of the few people able to manipulate O'Reily. He is also seen relaying information to Peter Schibetta from 'the family' and assisting Nappa in bringing down Adebisi. Having previously worked in a prison with a firing squad, he advises the officers on how to conduct Groves execution.
  (Curtis McClarin) – An African American officer. He defends Glynn when Groves attacks him, and he is accidentally stabbed to death. His death angers other officers to the point that they beat the inmates for minor infractions. His mother visits Oz to clean out his locker and meet Groves.
  (Paul Schulze) – A SORT team member, he is involved in putting an end to the riot. He gives his gun to Whittlesey and she uses it to kill Ross. Afterwards, he is seen being questioned about these events by both Case and McManus, though he does not reveal the truth.
  (Bill Fagerbakke) – A white supremacist guard who takes over Whittlesey's position in Emerald City after she is transferred to Unit B. He is secretly a member of the Aryan Brotherhood, and clearly favors the Aryan inmates. He lets Marck Mack and another Aryan switch to Busmalis and Rebadow's cell so they could escape using Busmalis' tunnel and lets Schillinger use the gym to crucify Sippel and cripple Beecher. McManus finds out about his connections with the Aryans, but Beecher covertly murders Metzger before he can do anything about it.
  (Nelson Vasquez) – An officer who was previously a member of a rival gang to El Cid's. He comes to Oz and works in Em City. Hernandez orders Alvarez to blind Rivera, which Alvarez does. Afterwards, Rivera participates in the Sister Pete's victim-offender program with Alvarez. He does not forgive Alvarez and the sessions end prematurely. When Alvarez trains a guide dog, he trains her in English and Spanish and gives the dog to Rivera, somewhat burying the hatchet between them.
  (Robert Clohessy) – An Irish-American CO, Murphy is the staff member most trusted by McManus. A fair and confident officer, Murphy maintains order to the best of his ability in Oz while doing what he can to support McManus' ideology. He is more honest and competent than the other guards and Warden Glynn also holds him in high regard. Appears in episodes 18–56.
  (Carl DiMaggio) – An officer working on Death Row, who is often seen siding with the Aryans. He brings Andrew Schillinger heroin on behalf of his father during his stay in the hole. During Bellinger's second stay on Death Row, he starts coming to her cell at night for sex. He spends some time in Em City, where he comes into conflict with Penders during the guide dog program.
  (Seth Gilliam) – A young and conflicted African American officer, Hughes is very close to Glynn. Hughes' father was Glynn's best friend and was killed while working as a CO when Hughes was seven years old. After being convinced by Adebisi that his father's murder was racially motivated, Hughes becomes a Black Nationalist and attempts to murder the governor. Hughes is sent to Unit-J in Oz which is meant for ex-cops and ex-correctional officers, only to be transferred to Solitary after murdering Johnny Basil. The isolation causes Hughes to suffer a psychotic break, and he manages to escape his cell and take the entire cell block hostage. When Glynn attempts to negotiate with him, Hughes tries to murder him, only to be stabbed to death by Penders.
  (Kristin Rohde) – A female CO, she is extremely unstable and prone to sadistic sexual violence. She begins a relationship with McManus but he breaks it off when she proves violent and possessive. She then accuses him of sexual harassment when he has her fired for misconduct and she is reinstated. She spend most of her time working in solitary, though she has a brief stint in Em City. She has sexual relationships with inmates, including Ryan O'Reily and Carlos Martinez, and murders Stanislofsky on O'Reily's request. She eventually begins to change after learning that she is pregnant, and is unsure who is the father. Appears in episodes 17–39, 41–56.
  – An elderly African American correctional officer. He appears briefly in Season four where he is killed by inmate Tarrant in a shootout.
  (Reg E. Cathey) – A jaded and results-oriented black man, Querns is hired by Glynn after pressure by community leaders and the black prison population, led by Adebisi, to hire a black Unit Manager to replace McManus. Querns, as told through a conversation to Adebisi, is only different from the black inmates in that he has been smart enough to have never been arrested for dealing drugs. The complete opposite of McManus, he believes that drugs are good for the prisoners because they subdue them until they are incapable of any discipline problems. He runs Emerald City by making Adebisi and his partners in Oz's drug trade the main trustees, allowing them to do all the drugs that they wish as long as no violence occurs in Emerald City. Kareem Saïd and McManus completely oppose this which leads to his firing. His efficiency, however, gets him promoted to the position of warden at another state correctional facility and he transfers back to Oz following the death of Leo Glynn.
  (Cyrus Farmer) – An African American officer who works in Em City during Querns' tenure. He is acquainted with Perry Loftus, Devlin's assistant, who asks him to organize the murders of Loewen, Bandt and Glynn. Once his involvement is revealed, he gives up Loftus and is allowed to go free.
  (Dena Atlantic) – A woman hired as Glynn's secretary. She proves invaluable at her job and almost everyone, inmates and staff, is attracted to her beauty.
  (Blake Robbins) – An officer with a talent for basketball. McManus recruits him as his teammate in a series of games against Vahue. He manages to win the second match after Vahue is injured. McManus organises for Brass to train with the NBA, however Morales has Martinez maim Brass by severing his Achilles tendon. Thereafter, Brass walks with a limp. He steals a winning lottery ticket from Rebadow, who intended to use the money for his ailing grandson. By the time he returns, Rebadow's grandson has died. Brass spends his time trying to get Martinez to confess Morales ordered his attack. After Martinez dies, Brass fakes hearing a deathbed confession and has Morales moved to solitary. He, Howell and Murphy then injure Morales in the same way as Brass. After Vahue is paroled, Brass tries to maintain contact with him, though Vahue is dismissive. Brass then tries to kill Vahue and is arrested.
  (Ellen McElduff) – A woman hired as the Liaison to the Governor's office, also McManus' ex-wife. Though hired to further Devlin's interests within the prison, she ends up siding with the staff on most issues and starts a relationship with Glynn. After Devlin's involvement in Glynn's murder is revealed, she abuses Devlin and quits her position.
  (Betty Buckley) – Inmate Ryan O'Reily's biological mother, though O'Reily was unaware of her existence. She ran away while O'Reily was a baby after being involved in a violent protest. She comes forward to admit her crime and is sentenced to community service at Oz. She works as a musical arts teacher and organizes the inmates to stage a production of Macbeth. Formerly had a relationship with Neema.
  (Aasif Mandvi) – An Arab dentist assigned to treat Robson's gum disease by performing a tissue graft operation. Infuriated by Robson's insults, he uses gum tissue from the body of a black man and arranges for the other inmates to learn this fact. Robson attacks Faraj once he hears the details, but Faraj knocks him out and has him sent to the Hole.
  (Patti LuPone) – The librarian of Oz. Adored by Robert Rebadow (who works with her in the library), she is reserved in returning his affection because of his reaction to her breast cancer diagnosis.
 Nurse  (Catherine Wolf) – A nurse who works in the hospital ward with Dr Nathan. She murders those she considers 'bad men', including Martinez and Morales. Dr Nathan realizes her crimes and she is arrested.
 Dr.  (Milo O'Shea) - A callous, incompetent doctor who takes over the medical ward after Devlin makes a deal with the private contractor Garvey works for. He is fired and publicly disgraced after it is discovered that he previously ran a back-alley abortion clinic, where he had accidentally killed a patient.

 Others 
 Governor James Devlin (Željko Ivanek) – A right-wing politician, Governor Devlin represents all extreme mechanisms of law and order to make society "crime free." He passes several acts to minimize prisoner rights and increase law enforcement spending. Disliked by several staff members and the vast majority of the inmates, Devlin eventually is in a sea of controversy once a city mayor whom he was politically involved with is sent to Oz for conspiring to commit a racially motivated bombing.
  (Susan Floyd) – Beecher's wife. On his first day in Oz, Rebadow informs Beecher that she is thinking of divorcing him. Despite this, she shares a conjugal visit with him but is clearly distressed by the experience. She proceeds with the divorce and moves away with the children. Some time later, she commits suicide via carbon monoxide poisoning. Though Schillinger mentions having her killed, when he later brags of his murders to Mayor Loewen he only mentions Beecher's father and son, implying that he was not involved in Genevieve's death and her death was a suicide.
  (Scott Cohen) – An FBI agent who visits Oz once in the first season to investigate the murders of inmates Dino Ortolani, Johnny Post, and AIDS patient inmate, Emilio Sanchez. He experiences Anti-Semitism during his visit but manages to piece together the story.
  (Charles S. Dutton) – Law school Dean; he investigates the prison riot after season one and, in season four, runs unsuccessfully for governor against Devlin.
  (Dick Bocelli) – Schillinger's father. Schillinger's sons stay with him while their father is in prison but Heinrick kicks them out when their drug habits become too much. He is as abusive as his son and they do not have a good relationship. Schillinger's sister eventually visits and telling him that Heinrick has lung cancer.
  – Dr Nathan's husband. He and Dr Nathan are having marital problems in Season 1 but are back together in Season 2. After O'Reilly falls in love with Dr Nathan, he convinces his brother Cyril to murder Preston.
 Miss Sally's Schoolyard (Miss Sally played by Whitney Allen) is a puppet show that the inmates enjoy watching because Miss Sally has large breasts. Busmalis is obsessed with the show and Miss Sally; he writes her fan letters, goes to her house when he escapes Oz and is often heard remarking "This is the best Miss Sally ever". Miss Sally's Schoolyard is eventually cancelled, but Miss Sally starts a new exercise show, Sally-cise, that the inmates continue to watch.
  (Arija Bareikis) – Scott Ross's sister. She visits Oz after Saïd contacts her about the lawsuit he is bringing against the state. She and Saïd fall for each other, which leads to Saïd's deposal as leader of the Muslims and she receives threatening phone calls. She visits several times, though Saïd remains aloof with her. When the case is won, she decides to use her money to move to California and begs Saïd to tell her he loves her. Saïd refuses, saying it will make her leaving easier. She is not seen again.
  (Edward Herrmann) – Beecher's father. He lets Beecher use his law firm's resources to locate Hank Schillinger and arrange his visit. He later works to get Keller's death sentence overturned, despite his distaste for his son's lover. In order to be accepted as a member of the Brotherhood, Winthrop murders him during one of his visits.
  (Jayce Bartok) – Beecher's younger brother. He visits Beecher a few times, complaining of the pressure he feels to be the ideal lawyer, husband and father since Beecher's arrest. During one of his visits, Robson stabs him with a shank made from a bed spring, though he survives.
  (Andrew Barchilon) – Schillinger's younger son and Carrie's husband. He lives with his grandfather until his grandfather kicks him out, at which point Schillinger loses contact with him. Beecher hires his father's law firm to locate Hank and pays him to visit his father in prison. Schillinger pays him to kidnap two of Beecher's children and murder his son, though he lets his daughter go. Hank is arrested for the crime but is let go on a technicality. Beecher hires Pancamo to arrange Hank's murder and though he tries to call it off, Hank is already dead. Since Hank indicated to his father he wanted to move to Florida, his murder is not discovered until his body is found six months later. Keller initially takes responsibility for the crime, though Pancamo is eventually discovered as the true culprit.
  (Robert John Burke) – Another FBI agent who often visits Oz (starting in the fourth season) to investigate cases. He originally investigates the kidnapping of Beecher's children, then moves onto the murders committed by Keller. Generally very effective at his job, but insensitive to the needs of inmates. He informs Schillinger that Pancamo arranged the murder of his son Hank. He essentially replaces Jeremy Goldstein.
  (Michelle Schumacher) – A former secretary to Miss Sally star, Whitney Allen. She receives Busmalis' fan letters and shows up to Oz, pretending to be Miss Sally, but her disguise does not work for long. She and Busmalis start a relationship and though she leaves him at the altar once and has a baby with her ex-boyfriend, they get back together and eventually marry.
  (Jenna Lamia) – Hank's wife who comes to visit Schillinger when Hank disappears following his murder. Schillinger is unaware of her existence and is initially skeptical but accepts her when she shows their marriage licence. She is pregnant and gives birth to a daughter, Jewel. A pimp in Oz tells Schillinger that Carrie worked for him as a prostitute, however a DNA test reveals that Jewel is Schillinger's granddaughter. Carrie is killed in the bus crash at the beginning of Season 5. Jewel survives and is sent to live with Carrie's parents.
  (Sandra Purpuro) – A lawyer who works towards Beecher's parole bid in Season 4. She is so certain of his being paroled that she even starts a relationship with him. After his application is rejected, they stay together. She originally works on defending Cyril O'Reily on his murder charge but recommends that the O'Reily family hire a more high-profile lawyer. Beecher later gets her to work on overturning Keller's death sentence. She is aware of Beecher's relationship with Keller, even remarking on the odd situation of representing her "boyfriend's boyfriend". After she becomes aware that Keller is guilty, she drops him as a client, breaks up with Beecher and leaves Oz.
 ''' (Christopher Jackson) – Governor James Devlin's assistant. He plays an instrumental role in orchestrating the murder of Wilson Loewen.

Sponsors 
Due to Emerald City's unconventional configuration and routine, each new inmate is given a sponsor to help acclimate. Inmates are generally paired with sponsors of similar nationality, background, race, and/or religion, to help acclimate, with the help of someone with similar interests and beliefs. Specific requests for current Emerald City prisoners to be paired up with inbound inmates have occasionally been made and granted. Below is a list of inmates and sponsors.

References